The Professional Academies' Magnet @ Loften High School (or W. Travis Loften High School) is a public high school in Gainesville, Florida in the United States. It is part of Alachua County School District and occupies a  campus in a medium-sized community.

Overview 
Unlike other high schools in the area, Loften is not a school where students are regularly zoned to attend and assigned. Loften remains a "school of choice" where students must actively seek the school out and apply as opposed to simply showing up due to location. While this ensures only students who really want to go actually attend, it also means that Loften has a very small student body.  Because of this, Loften averages around 300 students in the daytime. These students are divided among  44 teachers in a 4-period block schedule.

Career focus 
Beginning in the Fall of 2007, Loften became Alachua County's premier school for career and technical education. In total, it currently has five career-oriented programs including:

Academy of Automotive Technology 
Academy of Fire and EMS (Firefighting/Emergency Medical Services)
Academy of Gaming and Mobile App Development 
Academy of Robotics and Engineering
Institute of Graphic Art and Design

Discontinued Academies
Academy of Design and Technology 
Academy of Early Childhood Education

Administration 
 Principal: Kristopher Bracewell
 Assistant Principal: Angela Jones

References

External links 
 Loften High School online
 publicschoolreview.com
  AOIT official page

High schools in Alachua County, Florida
Public high schools in Florida
Education in Gainesville, Florida